A Persian Melody is a 2015 Iranian drama film directed by Hamid Reza Ghotbi.

Plot 
Shirin (Mahtab Keramati) returns to Iran after many years to attend the funeral of her deceased father. But in this ceremony, he realizes that secrets about his father are hidden from him that have roots in the past and...

Cast 
 Mahtab Keramati as Shirin 
 Mostafa Zamani as Mahmud 
 Baran Kosari as Gohar 
 Pegah Ahangarani as Mahlagha 
 Elham Nami
 Afsar Asadi as Mahlagha 
 Jamal Ejlali
 Farzaneh Neshat Khah
 Maryam Boubani
 Shirin Kazemi
 Maryam Rostami
 Fatemeh Mortazi
 Siavash Cheraghi Pour as Savash 
 Farzam as Ali Reza

Awards and nominations

References

External links

2015 films
2010s Persian-language films
Iranian drama films